is a Japanese kin group of the Sengoku period.

History

The clan claimed descent from the Seiwa-Genji.  The clan was founded by Ashikaga Kōshin (died 1330) who is the son of Ashikaga Yasuuji (1216-1270).
Near the end of the 13th century, the Isshiki were established as head of Isshiki Domain in Mikawa Province; and the name dates from this time.

The Isshiki held prominent offices in the bureaucracy of the Ashikaga shogunate. The Isshiki were one of four clans with the right to be head (bettō) of the Samurai-dokoro or war department.

Later, the Isshiki were military governors of the province of Tango since 1336. In 1575, Oda Nobunaga confirmed their Tango Province.

The family lost its domains during the wars of the Sengoku period.

Heads
 Isshiki Kimifuka
 Isshiki Yoshiyori
 Isshiki Yoshimichi
 Isshiki Yoshisada
 Isshiki Noriuji

Notable vassals
 Inadome Sukehide
 Inadome Sukenao

Castles
 Takebeyama Castle (Yata Castle)
 Yuminoki Castle

References

Japanese clans
Ashikaga clan